Renata Srbová (born 16 June 1972) is a Czech sailor. She competed in the women's 470 event at the 1992 Summer Olympics.

References

External links
 

1972 births
Living people
Czech female sailors (sport)
Olympic sailors of Czechoslovakia
Sailors at the 1992 Summer Olympics – 470
Sportspeople from Jablonec nad Nisou